The Aisne is a river in northeastern France. It is a left tributary of the Oise. It gave its name to the French department of Aisne.  It was known in the Roman period as Axona.

The river rises in the forest of Argonne, at Rembercourt-Sommaisne, near Sainte-Menehould. It flows north and then west before joining the Oise near Compiègne. Its main tributaries are the Vesle, the Aire and the Suippe. The Battle of the Axona was fought near there between the Romans and the Belgae in 57 BC. Three Battles of the Aisne were fought in the Aisne valley during the First World War.

Places along the river
Departments and towns along the river include:
 Meuse
 Marne: Sainte-Ménehould
 Ardennes: Vouziers, Rethel
 Aisne: Soissons
 Oise: Compiègne
 Aisne: Berny-Rivière

Navigation
The river Aisne was used for commercial navigation as early as the Celtic period, and rafts were floated from a long distance above the present limit of navigation at Vailly-sur-Aisne until the mid-19th century. Canalisation works were begun in 1836, at the same time as construction of the Canal lateral à l'Aisne. The canal was completed first, in 1841, then two years later the river navigation. Commercial traffic in péniches carrying 220 tonnes is still active, while recreational traffic is mainly private boats. Through the lateral canal, it links with the Marne and the Canal de la Meuse.

En route
The kilometre distances continue the numbering from Canal latéral à l'Aisne from east to west.
PK 51.3 is the end of the Canal latéral à l'Aisne
PK 64.5 Villeneuve-Saint-Germain
PK 67 Soissons
PK 79 Fontenoy
PK 85 Vic-sur-Aisne
PK 92 Couloisy
PK 104.5 Choisy-au-Bac
PK 108 junction with Canal latéral à l'Oise upstream of Compiègne

See also 
Rivers of France
List of Canals in France
Canal latéral à l'Aisne
Chemin des Dames
Battle of the Axona

References

External links 
 River Aisne and Canal lateral à l'Aisne maps and details about places, ports and moorings on the river, by the author of Inland Waterways of France, Imray
 Navigation details for 80 French rivers and canals (French waterways website section)
World Book encyclopedia 1988

Rivers of Aisne
Rivers of Ardennes (department)
Rivers of Marne (department)
Rivers of Meuse (department)
Rivers of France
Rivers of Oise
Aisne
Rivers of Grand Est
Rivers of Hauts-de-France